Agyneta brevipes is a species of sheet weaver found in the United States. It was described by Keyserling in 1886.

References

brevipes
Spiders of the United States
Spiders described in 1886